Deuterated chloroform, also known as chloroform-d, is the organic compound with the formula C2HCl3 or . Deuterated chloroform is a common solvent used in NMR spectroscopy.

Preparation
Deuterated chloroform is commercially available. It is more easily produced and less expensive than deuterated dichloromethane. Deuterochloroform is produced by the reaction of hexachloroacetone with deuterium oxide, using pyridine as a catalyst. The large difference in boiling points between the starting material and product facilitate purification by distillation.

NMR solvent
In proton NMR spectroscopy, deuterated solvent (enriched to >99% deuterium) is typically used to avoid recording a large interfering signal or signals from the proton(s) (i.e., hydrogen-1) present in the solvent itself. If nondeuterated chloroform (containing a full equivalent of protium) were used as solvent, the solvent signal would almost certainly overwhelm and obscure any nearby analyte signals.  In addition, modern instruments usually require the presence of deuterated solvent, as the field frequency is locked using the deuterium signal of the solvent to prevent frequency drift.  Commercial chloroform-d does, however, still contain a small amount (0.2% or less) of non-deuterated chloroform; this results in a small singlet at 7.26 ppm, known as the residual solvent peak, which is frequently used as an internal chemical shift reference. 

In carbon-13 NMR spectroscopy, the sole carbon in deuterated chloroform shows a triplet at a chemical shift of 77.16 ppm with the three peaks being about equal size, resulting from splitting by spin coupling to the attached spin-1 deuterium atom (CHCl3 has a chemical shift of 77.36 ppm). 

Deuterated chloroform is a general purpose NMR solvent, as it is not very chemically reactive and unlikely to exchange its deuterium with its solute, and its low boiling point allows for easy sample recovery.  It, however, it is incompatible with strongly basic, nucleophilic, or reducing analytes, including many organometallic compounds.

Hazards 
Chloroform reacts photochemically with oxygen to form chlorine, phosgene and hydrogen chloride. To slow this process and reduce the acidity of the solvent, chloroform-d is stored in brown-tinted bottles, often over copper chips or silver foil as stabilizer. Instead of metals, a small amount of a neutralizing base like potassium carbonate may be added. It is less toxic to the liver and kidneys than CHCl3 due to the presence of a C–D bond which is stronger than a C–H bond. The C–D bond is stronger than a C–H bond, making it somewhat less prone to form the destructive trichloromethyl radical (•CCl3).

References

Deuterated solvents
Organochlorides
Trichloromethyl compounds
Nuclear magnetic resonance
Deuterated compounds